is a railway line operated by West Japan Railway Company (JR West) between Himeji, Hyōgo and Niimi, Okayama, Japan. The name of the line comes from the first kanji of Himeji and Niimi which the line connects.

Stations
S: Trains stop
s: Some trains stop
｜: Trains pass

Rolling stock
New KiHa 122 and KiHa 127 series diesel multiple units (DMUs) were introduced on the line between Himeji and Kōzuki from spring 2009. Journey times were reduced from spring 2010 after the entire fleet of new trains had been delivered.

History

The first section of the line opened was from Tsuyama to the north in 1923, and the line was progressively extended until it reached Niimi in 1929. The section from Himeji opened in stages from 1930, and the line was completed in 1936.

CTC signalling was commissioned in 1986, and freight services ceased the following year.

Former connecting lines
 Shingu Station: The Tatsuno Electric Railway Co. opened a 17 km 1,435 mm gauge line electrified at 600 V DC from Shingu-Cho to Aboshiko between 1909 and 1915 which connected at this station, as well as the Sanyo Main Line at Aboshi. The line closed in 1934.

References

Rail transport in Hyōgo Prefecture
Rail transport in Okayama Prefecture
Lines of West Japan Railway Company
1067 mm gauge railways in Japan
Railway lines opened in 1923
1923 establishments in Japan